The 2017–18 Sydney Sixers Women's season was the third in the team's history. Coached by Ben Sawyer and captained by Ellyse Perry, the Sixers entered WBBL03 as the defending champions. They finished the regular season on top of the points table for the second season in a row and proceeded to reach a third-consecutive championship decider.

In the final, the Sixers claimed back-to-back titles with a comfortable nine-wicket defeat of the Perth Scorchers at Adelaide Oval, during which Sarah Coyte punctuated an emphatic return to top-level domestic cricket by claiming figures of 4/17 and earning Player of the Match honours.

Squad
Each WBBL|03 squad featured 15 active players, with an allowance of up to five marquee signings including a maximum of three from overseas. Australian marquees were defined as players who made at least ten limited-overs appearances for the national team in the three years prior to the cut-off date (24 April 2017).

Personnel changes for the Sixers ahead of the season included:

 Lisa Sthalekar retired at the conclusion of WBBL02.
 Rhiannon Dick departed the team and subsequently joined the Adelaide Strikers.
 Erin Burns joined the team after departing the Hobart Hurricanes.
 Lauren Cheatle signed a three-year contract with the team, departing the Sydney Thunder. However, she would miss the entire season due to a back stress fracture injury.

The backend of the tournament was notable for the comeback of medium-pace bowler Sarah Coyte, who had previously played for the Adelaide Strikers until retiring at the conclusion of WBBL|02. With South African marquee players Marizanne Kapp and Dane van Niekerk unavailable for the climax of the competition, coach Ben Sawyer approached Coyte—who had been playing cricket for her local club Penrith occasionally during the summer—about signing for the Sixers as a replacement player. Upon returning to the league, she delivered "exemplary bowling" performances to claim ten wickets at an average of 8.10 in four matches.

England marquee Amy Jones also signed as a replacement player for the Sixers, having performed a similar role for the team during WBBL|02.

The table below lists the Sixers players and their key stats (including runs scored, batting strike rate, wickets taken, economy rate, catches and stumpings) for the season.

Ladder

Fixtures

Regular season

Knockout phase

Statistics and awards 

 Most runs: Ellyse Perry – 552 (1st in the league)
 Highest score in an innings: Ashleigh Gardner – 114 (52) vs Melbourne Stars, 9 December 2017
 Most wickets: Sarah Aley – 23 (equal 1st in the league)
 Best bowling figures in an innings: Dane van Niekerk – 4/13 (4 overs) vs Melbourne Renegades, 2 January 2018
 Most catches (fielder): Erin Burns – 9 (equal 3rd in the league)
 Player of the Match awards:
 Sarah Coyte, Alyssa Healy, Ellyse Perry, Dane van Niekerk – 2 each
 Sarah Aley, Erin Burns, Marizanne Kapp – 1 each
 Sixers Player of the Tournament: Ellyse Perry
 WBBL|03 Player of the Tournament: Ellyse Perry (3rd)
 WBBL|03 Team of the Tournament: Sarah Aley, Ellyse Perry, Dane van Niekerk
 WBBL|03 Young Gun Award: Ashleigh Gardner (nominated)

References

2017–18 Women's Big Bash League season by team
Sydney Sixers (WBBL)